Erika Zuchold (née Barth; 19 March 1947 – 22 August 2015) was an East German gymnast who competed at the European, World, and Olympic level from the mid-1960s to early 1970s.

She and Karin Janz were the two most significant (in terms of medals won at major championships) female German gymnasts of the era, leading the East German team to a bronze medal at the 1968 Olympics and a silver medal at the 1972 Olympics.

The highlight of Zuchold's career came at the 1970 World Championships, where she placed second in the individual all-around behind the Soviet Ludmilla Tourischeva and returned to win gold on both vault and balance beam in event finals.

Zuchold is credited as being the first woman to perform a back handspring on balance beam in World or Olympic competition (at the 1966 World Championships), as well as one of the first two women, along with Věra Čáslavská at the 1968 Olympics, to complete a front handspring on balance beam. She also had a transition element named after her on uneven bars.

In her post-gymnastics career, she was a trapeze artist, a curator, an educator, and an abstract painter. In 2005, she was inducted into the International Gymnastics Hall of Fame.

She was married to the cyclist Dieter Zuchold (1937–2014).

See also

 List of top Olympic gymnastics medalists

References

External links

  
 International Gymnastics Hall of Fame
 
 

1947 births
2015 deaths
People from Lucka
German female artistic gymnasts
Olympic gymnasts of East Germany
Gymnasts at the 1968 Summer Olympics
Gymnasts at the 1972 Summer Olympics
Olympic silver medalists for East Germany
Olympic medalists in gymnastics
World champion gymnasts
Medalists at the World Artistic Gymnastics Championships
Sportspeople from Thuringia
Medalists at the 1972 Summer Olympics
Medalists at the 1968 Summer Olympics
Olympic bronze medalists for East Germany
Recipients of the Patriotic Order of Merit in gold
German emigrants to Paraguay